Two ships of the United States Navy have been named Catalpa.

 The first , was a screw tug, built in Brooklyn, New York, in 1864 as Conqueror.
 , was launched 22 February 1941 by the Commercial Iron Works.

United States Navy ship names